Amalia is an unincorporated community in Taos County, New Mexico, United States.

Description

Amalia is located near the Colorado border, on New Mexico State Road 196.

Amalia has a post office, with the ZIP code 87512. The 87512 ZIP Code Tabulation Area had a population of  230 at the 2000 census.

History
Amalia was formerly known as Pina. A post office was established in 1900, before being renamed Amalia in 1919.

In summer of 2018, at a remote site with a small camping trailer within a surrounding wall of car tires, five adults, 11 hungry children (ages 1 to 15), and later a dead child, were found. Court documents stated the children had been trained for shootings at schools. 
Federal terrorism, kidnapping, and firearms charges were brought against five adults in March 2019.

See also

References

External links

 Amalia Populated Place Profile / Taos County, New Mexico Data

Unincorporated communities in New Mexico
Unincorporated communities in Taos County, New Mexico
Terrorist training camps